Carr Hollow is a valley in Shannon County in the U.S. state of Missouri. The southeast flowing intermittent stream in the valley is a tributary to McHenry Hollow.

Carr Hollow has the name of the local Carr family.

References

Valleys of Shannon County, Missouri
Valleys of Missouri